Leonardo Sernicola (born 30 July 1997) is an Italian footballer who plays as a left back for  club Cremonese.

Club career

Early career 
Sernicola was born in Civita Castellana in Italy's Lazio region. In his youth, the youth teams of local Serie A giants Lazio and Roma were interested in the young defender, but judged him to be too small and slight to play professionally. He also had an unsuccessful trial with Perugia, before signing with the youth teams of Ternana across the border in Umbria. He went on to make nearly 50 appearances for the Primavera side.

Ternana 
Sernicola played at various age levels within the Ternana youth setup, and his physical growth of 20 cm in two years allowed him to compete with larger opponents, contrary to the beliefs of teams that refused him. In 2016, he was promoted to the first team at the end of the 2015–16 season and remained with the team as the Rossoverdi prepared for the 2016–17 season. He made his debut for the first team on 7 May 2016, coming on as a substitute for Fabiano Santacroce in the 63rd minute of a 1–1 draw with Cesena. He played the full 90 minutes of the next two games; the final two games of the season. He did not play as regularly in the 2016–17 season, and subsequently made a loan move in January 2017 to Fondi of Lega Pro. His debut for Fondi came as a substitute in a 1–1 draw with Catania on 23 January 2017.

Sassuolo
On 28 June 2018, Sernicola signed with Serie A team Sassuolo. On 9 July 2019, he joined to Virtus Entella until 30 June 2020. On 29 January 2020, he moved on another loan to Ascoli. On 25 September 2020 he joined SPAL on loan.

Loan to Cremonese 
On 20 July 2021 Sernicola was loaned to Cremonese.

Cremonese 
On 8 July 2022, Cremonese announced the signing of Sernicola on a permanent deal.

Career statistics

References

External links

Living people
1997 births
Sportspeople from the Province of Viterbo
Association football fullbacks
Italian footballers
Italy youth international footballers
Ternana Calcio players
S.S. Racing Club Fondi players
Matera Calcio players
U.S. Sassuolo Calcio players
Virtus Entella players
Ascoli Calcio 1898 F.C. players
S.P.A.L. players
U.S. Cremonese players
Serie A players
Serie B players
Serie C players
Footballers from Lazio